Lăpușna may refer to:

 Lăpușna County (Romania), a former county in the Kingdom of Romania
 Lăpușna County (Moldova), a former administrative region of Moldova
 Lăpușna, Hîncești, a commune in Hîncești district, Moldova
 Lăpușna, a village in Ibănești, Mureș commune, Romania
 Lăpușna, the Romanian name of Lopushna village in Vyzhnytsia Raion, Ukraine
 Lăpușna, a tributary of the Gurghiu in Mureș County, Romania
 Lăpușna (Prut), a tributary of the Prut in the Republic of Moldova

See also 
 Lăpuș (disambiguation)